Nacera Bukamoum (born 9 May 1971) is an Algerian alpine skier. She competed in the 1992 Winter Olympics in both the Women's Super G and Women's Giant Slalom. She was the flag bearer for Algeria in the Opening Ceremonies.

References

1971 births
Living people
Algerian female alpine skiers
Alpine skiers at the 1992 Winter Olympics
Olympic alpine skiers of Algeria
21st-century Algerian people